Paleo is a novel based on the TV series Buffy the Vampire Slayer.

Plot summary

A student named Kevin Sanderson transfers to Sunnydale High and he's extremely lonely until a lecture is given to his class by a man named Daniel that works for Sunnydale's Museum of Natural History. Kevin immediately considers Daniel to be his mentor as they both thoroughly enjoy palaeontology. Unfortunately Daniel's goal is not at all the same as that of Kevin, who is just trying to fit in. Daniel has found some manuscripts which will help him resurrect dinosaur eggs, and Kevin seems to be the only person with the appropriate eggs. Meanwhile, Oz is getting an offer from a woman named Alysa Bardrick to help run their band. She wants to be their manager but the band members of Dingoes Ate My Baby are still unsure as to her intentions. Soon, Daniel and Kevin's ritual goes very badly and prehistoric dangers literally stalk the halls of Sunnydale High.

Continuity

Supposed to be set late in Buffy season 3, after Xander and Cordelia have broken up.

Canonical issues

Buffy novels such as this one are not considered by most fans as part of canon. They are usually not considered as official Buffyverse reality, but are novels from the authors' imaginations. However unlike fanfic, 'overviews' summarising their story, written early in the writing process, were 'approved' by both Fox and Whedon (or his office), and the books were therefore later published as officially Buffy merchandise.

External links

Reviews
Litefoot1969.bravepages.com - Review of this book by Litefoot
Teen-books.com - Reviews of this book
Nika-summers.com - Review of this book by Nika Summers
Shadowcat.name - Review of this book

2000 novels
Books based on Buffy the Vampire Slayer
Pocket Books books
Novels about dinosaurs